Jorge Armando Mora Guzmán (born 16 January 1991) is a Mexican professional footballer who plays as a midfielder for Durango. He is the son of former player Octavio Mora as well as the nephew of manager and former player, Mexican Daniel Guzmán.

Club career

Guadalajara
Mora was added to the Club Deportivo Guadalajara first team roster when they played in the 2010 Copa Libertadores. He co-captained the Chivas sub-20 team. On 19 February he scored his first goal and now holds the record for the fastest goal for a debut.

International career

Mexico U20
In the Torneo de Las Americas tournament, Mora was one of the captains on the Mexico U-20 team.

Honours
Mexico U20
CONCACAF U-20 Championship: 2011

References

External links

1991 births
Living people
Mexican footballers
Footballers from Guadalajara, Jalisco
Association football midfielders
Liga MX players
Ascenso MX players
Liga de Expansión MX players
C.D. Guadalajara footballers
Correcaminos UAT footballers
Leones Negros UdeG footballers
Segunda División B players
Salamanca CF UDS players
Mexican expatriate footballers
Mexican expatriate sportspeople in Spain
Expatriate footballers in Spain